Sir Alfred Joseph Law (31 May 1860 – 18 July 1939) was a Conservative Party politician in the United Kingdom.

Born in West Bromwich, he was elected at the 1918 general election as Member of Parliament (MP) for the Rochdale constituency in Lancashire, but was defeated at the 1922 general election.

He was returned to the House of Commons at the 1929 general election for the High Peak constituency in Derbyshire, and held the seat until his death in Littleborough 1939, aged 79.

In 1921 Law donated the trophy for a rugby league match between Oldham and Rochdale. It was originally known as the Infirmaries Cup and later renamed as the Law Cup.

Sir Alfred was the owner of the poet Robert Burns's First Commonplace Book 1783–1785 manuscript volume that he had inherited from William Law of Honresfield, Lancashire, his uncle. The poet's second commonplace book, the Edinburgh Journal is held by the Robert Burns Birthplace Museum in Alloway, South Ayrshire.

References

External links 
 

1860 births
1939 deaths
Conservative Party (UK) MPs for English constituencies
Members of the Parliament of the United Kingdom for constituencies in Derbyshire
UK MPs 1918–1922
UK MPs 1929–1931
UK MPs 1931–1935
UK MPs 1935–1945
Members of the Parliament of the United Kingdom for Rochdale
High Peak, Derbyshire